This article shows all participating team squads at the 2007 Men's Pan-American Volleyball Cup, held from June 1 to June 9, 2007 in Santo Domingo, Dominican Republic.

Head Coach: Chris Green

Head Coach: Juan Carlos Gala

Head Coach: Juan Carlos Perdomo

Head Coach: Carlos Novoa

Head Coach: José Remon

Head Coach: Jorge Pérez Vento

Head Coach: Gideon Dickson

References
 Rosters 

S
P